Forward Challenge 06 was an exercise in crisis operations and continuity of government operation conducted by the Federal Emergency Management Agency and other agencies in June 2006. The exercise included activities at Mount Weather in Virginia.

References

Federal Emergency Management Agency
Continuity of government in the United States
Disaster preparedness in the United States